Garth Webb (1918 – 8 May 2012) was a Canadian soldier who founded the Juno Beach Centre.  Webb fought in World War II as a member of the 14th Field Regiment, Royal Canadian Artillery.  He was awarded the Meritorious Service Cross and the Legion of Honour medal.

Webb was born in Calgary, Alberta in 1918.  He was educated at Queen's University, and graduated from the Canadian Officers' Training Corps in 1942.  He was a lieutenant in the Canadian Army assigned to the 14th Field Regiment, Royal Canadian Artillery.  He fought on D-Day at the Juno Beach landings where he came ashore at Bernières-sur-Mer with his Priest 105mm self-propelled howitzer.

After the war, Webb completed a degree in commerce at Queen's University and moved to Toronto where he was a real estate appraiser.

Visiting the beaches of Normandy during the commemoration of the 50th anniversary of the Normandy Landings, Webb noticed that there was very little to mark the efforts of Canadian troops.  This spurred him to lead an effort to build the Juno Beach Centre, a museum and education centre at Courseulles-sur-Mer, France.  For his work to found the Juno Beach Centre, Webb was awarded the Meritorious Service Cross from Canada (2003) and the Legion of Honour medal from France (2005).

Webb died on 8 May 2012 in Burlington, Ontario.  Garth Webb Secondary School in Oakville, Ontario is named in his honour.

References

External links
 Obituary from Juno Beach Centre

1918 births
2012 deaths
Museum founders
People from Calgary
Canadian military personnel of World War II
20th-century philanthropists